The cruiser Bayan (Russian: Баян) was the name ship of the four  armoured cruisers built for the Imperial Russian Navy in the first decade of the 20th century. The ship had to be built in France because there was no available capacity in Russia. Bayan was assigned to the First Pacific Squadron after completion and based at Port Arthur from the end of 1903. She suffered minor damage during the Battle of Port Arthur at the beginning of the Russo-Japanese War of 1904–05 and supported destroyers as they patrolled outside the harbour. After bombarding Japanese positions in July 1904, the ship struck a mine and was out of action for the next several months. Bayan was sunk during the Siege of Port Arthur and was then salvaged by the Japanese after the war.

Renamed Aso by the Imperial Japanese Navy (IJN) she served as a training ship after extensive repairs. The ship was converted into a minelayer in 1917 and was decommissioned in 1930 to serve as a target ship. She was eventually sunk as a target in 1932.

Design and description
Unlike previous Russian armoured cruisers, the Bayan-class ships were designed as scouts for the fleet. The ships had a crew of 573 officers and men.

The Bayan class had two vertical triple-expansion steam engines, each driving a single propeller shaft using steam provided by 26 Belleville boilers.

Bayans main armament consisted of two  45-calibre guns in single turrets fore and aft of the superstructure. Her eight  guns were mounted in casemates on the sides of the ship's hull. Anti-torpedo boat defence was provided by twenty  50-calibre guns; eight of these were mounted in casemates on the side of the hull and in the superstructure. The remaining guns were located above the six-inch gun casemates in pivot mounts with gun shields. Bayan also mounted eight  and two  Hotchkiss guns. The ship had two submerged  torpedo tubes, one on each broadside.

The ship used Harvey armour throughout.

Construction and career
Bayan, named after the bard Boyan, had to be ordered in May 1898 from the French shipyard Forges et Chantiers de la Méditerranée in La Seyne-sur-Mer because there was no capacity available in Russian shipyards. The ship was laid down in February 1899 and launched on 12 June 1900. Bayan was completed in February 1903 and, under the command of Captain 1st Rank Robert Wiren, made port visits in Greece, Italy and North Africa before sailing for Kronstadt. Arriving in April 1903, she was only there for several months before departing for Port Arthur on 7 August. Together with the French-built battleship , Bayan arrived on 2 December and they were both assigned to the First Pacific Squadron.

On the night of 8/9 February 1904, the IJN launched a surprise attack on the Russian fleet at Port Arthur. Bayan was not hit by the initial torpedo-boat incursion and sortied the following morning when the Combined Fleet, commanded by Vice Admiral Tōgō Heihachirō, attacked. Tōgō had expected the surprise night attack by his ships to be much more successful than it was, anticipating that the Russians would be badly disorganized and weakened, but they had recovered from their surprise and were ready for his assault. The Japanese vessels had been spotted by the protected cruiser , which was patrolling offshore, and alerted the Russian defences. Tōgō chose to attack the Russian coastal defences with his main armament and engage the ships with his secondary guns. Splitting his fire proved to be a poor decision as the Japanese  and six-inch guns inflicted inconsequential damage on the Russian ships, which concentrated all their fire on their opponents with some effect. Bayan suffered superficial damage from nine hits and numerous splinters; 6 crewmen were killed and 35 injured. The ship fired 28 eight-inch, 100 six-inch and 160 seventy-five-millimetre shells during the battle.

The damage to Bayan was repaired in several days and subsequently the cruiser patrolled off Port Arthur. Together with the protected cruiser , the ship sortied on 11 March 1904 to support the destroyer . Under attack by Japanese destroyers, the ship was sunk before help arrived. Early on the morning of 13 April, the Russian destroyer Strashnii fell in with four Japanese destroyers in the darkness while on patrol. Once her captain realized his mistake, the Russian ship attempted to escape but failed after a Japanese shell struck one of her torpedoes and caused it to detonate. By this time Bayan had sortied to provide support, but was only able to rescue five survivors before a Japanese squadron of protected cruisers attacked. Vice Admiral Stepan Makarov led a force of two battleships and three cruisers out to support Bayan and also ordered the rest of the First Pacific Squadron to follow as soon as they could. In the meantime, the Japanese had reported the Russian sortie to Tōgō and he arrived with all six Japanese battleships. Heavily outnumbered, Makarov ordered his ships to retreat and to join the rest of the squadron that was just exiting the harbour. En route, however, his flagship, struck a mine and sank almost instantly.

Bayan sailed with the rest of the Pacific Squadron on 23 June in an abortive attempt to reach Vladivostok. The new squadron commander, Rear Admiral Wilgelm Vitgeft, ordered the squadron to return to Port Arthur when it encountered the Japanese fleet shortly before sunset, as he did not wish to engage his numerically superior opponents in a night battle. After bombarding Imperial Japanese Army positions on 27 July, the ship struck a mine and was under repair until September. After the death of Vitgeft during the Battle of the Yellow Sea on 10 August, Wiren was promoted to rear admiral and became the commander of the First Pacific Squadron. Bayan was subsequently trapped in Port Arthur and sunk at her mooring by five  howitzer shells on 9 December.

Japanese service

After the war, Bayans wreck was refloated on 24 June and towed to Dairen. There she was given temporary repairs and commissioned as Aso (named after a volcano in Kumamoto Prefecture) on 22 August. The next day she was towed to Maizuru, Japan for permanent repairs that lasted until July 1908. During this time, her boilers were replaced by Miyabara water-tube boilers and the majority of her armament was replaced with Japanese weapons.  Aso was armed with two original 8-inch 45 caliber guns,  Eight 6-inch 45 caliber Armstrong GG guns and sixteen 3-inch 40 caliber Armstrong N guns.

On 7 September 1908, Aso,  together with the ex-Russian protected cruiser , was assigned to the Training Squadron. On 14 March 1909 they began a training cruise that took their naval cadets to the West Coast of the United States and Canada and Hawaii before they returned to Yokosuka on 7 August. The next year the two ships made a cruise to Australia and Southeast Asia that last from 1 February to 3 July 1910. They were briefly relieved of their assignment to the Training Squadron on 25 September before rejoining it on 1 April 1911. The next training cruise lasted from 25 November 1911 to 28 March 1912 and took the cadets to the same destinations as the 1910 cruise. On 20 April 1912, Aso was transferred away from the Training Squadron and she was refitted in March 1913. During this refit, her eight-inch guns were replaced by a pair of six-inch guns 50 caliber guns and her torpedo tubes were removed. Aso and Soya were reassigned to the Training Squadron on 1 December 1914 and they made their last training cruise from 20 April to 23 August 1915, during which they visited Rabaul, New Guinea, and Fremantle, Australia.

In 1917, Aso was converted into a minelayer, with a capacity of 420 mines, although she was not formally reclassified as such until 1 April 1920. Aso was stricken from the navy list on 1 April 1930 and renamed Hai Kan No. 4.

Notes

Footnotes

Bibliography

External links

 Image gallery of Bayan-class cruisers

Bayan-class cruisers
Ships built in France
1900 ships
Russo-Japanese War cruisers of Russia
Shipwrecks of the Russo-Japanese War
Shipwrecks of China
Captured ships
Cruisers of the Imperial Japanese Navy
World War I cruisers of Japan
Ships sunk as targets
Minelayers of the Imperial Japanese Navy
Maritime incidents in 1932
Naval ships captured by Japan during the Russo-Japanese War
Ships sunk by coastal artillery